is a district located in Sōya Subprefecture, Hokkaido, Japan.

As of 2004, the district has an estimated population of 2,925 and a density of 4.96 persons per km2. The total area is 590.00 km2.

Towns and villages
Sarufutsu

Districts in Hokkaido